Carlos Jesus Pereira (born 3 September 1910, date of death unknown) was a Portuguese footballer who played as midfielder.

International career 
Pereira gained 13 caps and scored 1 goal for Portugal. He made his debut 5 May 1935 in Lisbon against Spain, in a 3-3 draw.

External links 
 
 

1910 births
Year of death missing
Boavista F.C. players
FC Porto players
Portugal international footballers
Portuguese footballers
Primeira Liga players
Association football midfielders